Exactis LLC is a data broker established in 2015 and based in the U.S state of Florida. The firm reportedly handles business and consumer data in an effort to refine targeted advertising.

Data leak
Exactis became notable in June 2018, after a discovery by cybersecurity researcher Vinny Troia detailed how the organization made nearly 340 million detailed records about individual people available on a publicly accessible server, leaving those people at heightened risk of being impersonated, profiled or otherwise exploited through social engineering. The information has reportedly since been protected and removed from the public. However, the leak is notable due to the breach of data that was exposed, surpassing the Equifax breach which had exposed 145 million customers' personal data the year prior.

Exactis had reportedly accumulated some or all of its information without the knowledge or explicit consent of the data subjects.

References 

Companies based in Florida
Data brokers
2015 establishments in Florida